Lin Bing, (also called Lin Ping) is a female giant panda in Thailand.  Born on 27 May 2009 at Chiang Mai Zoo in Chiang Mai, Thailand by Gamete intrafallopian transfer (GIFT) to Lin Hui and Chuang Chuang, it is the first giant panda born in Thailand. Its name, meaning the "Forest of Ice," was chosen after a nationwide name selection contest that attracted 22 million votes.  "Bing" also sounds similar to the name of the Ping River, which flows through Northern Thailand, where the zoo is located.

Like her parents, Lin Bing is considered the property of China. Therefore, Lin Bing was scheduled to be sent to China after she turns two years old.  The news of her birth and subsequent publicity have attracted many more tourists to the zoo, influencing the organisation's decision to build a 60 million baht (approximately $1.5 million) worth dome for residing the cub.  The care of the panda is undertaken by Thai scientists and veterinarians specially trained by China's giant panda specialists.

On July 8 2017, Lin Bing was delivered of two baby twin pandas, one male and one female.

Lin Bing's father Chuang Chuang died on September 16, 2019, in his enclosure at Chiang Mai Zoo at the age of 19.

References 

Individual giant pandas
2009 animal births